Guedes is a Portuguese surname. Notable people with the surname include:

Alexandre Guedes (born 1994), Portuguese footballer
Álvarez Guedes (1927–2013), Cuban comedian, actor, writer and businessman
Baltasar Guedes de Sousa, Captain-major of Portuguese Ceylon
Beto Guedes (born 1951), Brazilian singer-songwriter
Christophe Guedes (born 1993), Swiss footballer
Daniel Guedes (born 1994), Brazilian footballer
Fátima Guedes (born 1958), Brazilian singer and composer
Gonçalo Guedes (born 1996), Portuguese footballer
Hélder Guedes (born 1987), Portuguese footballer
Joaquim Guedes (1932–2008), Brazilian architect and urban planner
Marcelo Antônio Guedes Filho (born 1987), Brazilian footballer
Manuel Guedes (born 1953), Portuguese footballer
Miguel Guedes (born 1972), Portuguese musician
Pancho Guedes (born 1925), Portuguese architect, sculptor, and painter
Rita Guedes (born 1972), Brazilian actress
Róger Guedes (born 1996), Brazilian footballer
Sérgio Guedes (born 1962), Brazilian footballer and manager
Paulo Guedes (born 1949), Brazilian economist and Finance Minister (2019-2023)

See also
19875 Guedes, a main-belt asteroid
Guedes Lupapa (born 1988), Angolan footballer

Portuguese-language surnames